The men's individual W1 archery competition at the 2004 Summer Paralympics was held from 21 to 25 September at the Olympic Baseball Centre (Athens).

The event was won by John Cavanagh, representing .

Results

Ranking Round

Competition bracket

[1] Decided by additional arrows: 6:9
[2] Decided by additional arrows: 9:8
[3] Decided by additional arrows: 9:9,8:8,8:X

References

M